Charles XIV John (born Jean Bernadotte; 26 January 1763 – 8 March 1844) was King of Sweden and Norway from 1818 until his death in 1844. Before his reign he was a Marshal of France during the Napoleonic Wars and participated in several battles. In modern Norwegian lists of kings he is called Charles III John. He was the first monarch of the Bernadotte dynasty.

Born in Pau in southern France, Bernadotte joined the French Royal Army in 1780. Following the outbreak of the French Revolution, he exhibited great military talent, rapidly rising through the ranks, and was made a brigadier general by 1794. He served with distinction in Italy and Germany, and was briefly Minister of War. His relationship with Napoleon was turbulent; nevertheless, Napoleon named him a Marshal of the Empire on the proclamation of the French Empire. Bernadotte played a significant role in the French victory at Austerlitz, and was made Prince of Pontecorvo as a reward. Bernadotte was, through marriage to Désirée Clary, brother-in-law to Joseph Bonaparte, and thus a member of the extended Imperial family.

In 1810, Bernadotte was unexpectedly elected the heir-presumptive (Crown Prince) to the childless King Charles XIII of Sweden, thanks to the advocacy of Baron Carl Otto Mörner, a Swedish courtier and obscure member of the Riksdag of the Estates. He assumed the name Charles John and was named regent, and generalissimo of the Swedish Armed Forces, soon after his arrival becoming de facto head of state for most of his time as Crown Prince. In 1813, following the sudden unprovoked French invasion of Swedish Pomerania, Crown Prince Charles John was instrumental in the creation of the Sixth Coalition by allying with Tsar Alexander and using Swedish diplomacy to bring warring Russia and Britain together in alliance. He then played a major role in the writing of the Trachenberg Plan, the war-winning Allied campaign plan, and commanded the Allied Army of the North that defeated two concerted French attempts to capture Berlin and made the decisive attack on the last day of the catastrophic French defeat at Leipzig.

After the War of the Sixth Coalition, Charles John forced King Frederick VI of Denmark to cede Norway to Sweden, leading to the Swedish–Norwegian War of 1814 where Norway was defeated in 19 days. This put Norway into a union with Sweden, which lasted for almost a century before its peaceful 1905 dissolution. The Swedish–Norwegian war is viewed as Sweden's last direct conflict and war.

Upon the death of Charles XIII in 1818, Charles John ascended to the thrones. He presided over a period of peace and prosperity, and reigned until his death in 1844.

Early life and family

Jean-Baptiste Jules Bernadotte was born on 26 January 1763 in Pau, the capital of the province of Béarn in the southwestern part of the Kingdom of France. He was the son of Jean Henri Bernadotte (1711–1780), prosecutor at Pau, and his wife (married at Boeil, 20 February 1754) Jeanne de Saint-Jean (1728–1809), niece of the lay abbot of Sireix. The family name was originally du Poey (or de Pouey), but was changed to Bernadotte—a surname of an ancestress at the beginning of the 17th century. He was the youngest of five siblings, two of whom died in childhood. Soon after his birth, Baptiste was added to his name, to distinguish him from his elder brother Jean Évangeliste. Bernadotte himself added Jules to his first names as a tribute to the French Empire under Napoleon I.

At the age of 14, he was apprenticed to a local attorney. Aged 17, his father's death dissuaded him from following in his career.

Early military career
Bernadotte joined the army as a private in the Régiment Royal–La Marine on 3 September 1780, and first served in the newly conquered territory of Corsica. Subsequently, the Régiment stationed in Besançon, Grenoble, Vienne, Marseille and Île de Ré. He reached the rank of sergeant in August 1785 and was nicknamed Sergeant Belle-Jambe, for his smart appearance. In early 1790 he was promoted to Adjutant-Major, the highest rank for non-commissioned officers in the Ancien Régime.

Revolutionary Wars
Following the outbreak of the French Revolution, his eminent military qualities brought him speedy promotion. Bernadotte's promotions came both from the esteem of his commanders as well as from his men; having been elected to the rank of lieutenant colonel and colonel by his men, though he refused both nominations in favor of traditional advancement.

It was during this period of rapid advancement that the military qualities he became known for, daring assaults and gasconades, came to the fore. Of the latter, Bernadotte was gifted in his ability to inspire his men to prodigious feats of valor. As Colonel and commander of the 71st Demi-Brigade, Bernadotte rallied his men, who were retreating in disorder before an Austrian attack, by tearing off his epaulettes, throwing them to the ground before his men and shouting “If you dishonor yourselves by flight, I refuse to remain your colonel!” Soldiers left the ranks, gathered his epaulettes, pressed them into his hands, formed ranks and reformed the line and counter-attacked.

By 1794 he was promoted to brigadier, attached to the Army of Sambre-et-Meuse. After Jourdan's victory at Fleurus (26 June 1794), where he distinguished himself with a decisive attack and seizure of key terrain that led to the Austrian retreat, he became a divisional general.

Bernadotte played key roles throughout the next 18 months during the three French invasions into Germany; often employed in the place of honor during offensives leading the vanguard, and in retreat as a defensive specialist commanding the rearguard.

At the Battle of Theiningen (1796), where the Austrians outnumbered the French three to one, Bernadotte's rear-guard successfully repulsed numerous attacks while inflicting heavy losses on the enemy, preventing the Archduke Charles from cutting off the retreat of the French army over the Rhine after its defeat by the Austrians at the Battle of Würzburg.

At the beginning of 1797 he was ordered by the Directory to march with 20,000 men as reinforcements to Napoleon Bonaparte's army in Italy. His successful crossing of the Alps through the storm in midwinter was highly praised but coldly received by the Italian Army. Upon receiving insult from Dominique Martin Dupuy, the commander of Milan, Bernadotte was to arrest him for insubordination. Dupuy was a close friend of Louis-Alexandre Berthier and this started a long-lasting feud between Bernadotte and Napoleon's Chief of Staff.

He had his first interview with Napoleon in Mantua and was appointed the commander of the 4th division. During the invasion of Friuli and Istria, Bernadotte distinguished himself greatly at the passage of the Tagliamento where he led the vanguard, and at the capture of the fortress of Gradisca (19 March 1797). After the 18th Fructidor, Napoleon ordered his generals to collect from their respective divisions' addresses in favor of the coup d'état of that day; but Bernadotte sent an address to the directory different from that which Napoleon wished for and without conveying it through Napoleon's hands.

After the Treaty of Campo Formio, Napoleon gave Bernadotte a friendly visit at his headquarters at Udine, but immediately after deprived him of half his division of the army of the Rhine, and commanded him to march the other half back to France. Paul Barras, one of five directors, was cautious that Napoleon would overturn the Republic, so he appointed Bernadotte commander-in-chief of the Italian Army in order to offset Napoleon's power. Bernadotte was pleased with this appointment but Napoleon lobbied Talleyrand-Périgord, the Minister of Foreign Affairs, to appoint him to the embassy of Vienna instead. Bernadotte was very dissatisfied; he finally accepted the post in Vienna, but had to quit owing to the disturbances caused by his hoisting the tricolour over the embassy.

After returning from Vienna, he resided in Paris. He married Désirée Clary in August 1798, the daughter of a Marseilles merchant, and once engaged to Napoleon, and Joseph Bonaparte's sister-in-law. In November of the same year he was made commander of the army of observation on the upper Rhine. Although solicited to do so by Barras and Joseph Bonaparte, he did not take part in the coup d'état of the 30th Prairial. From 2 July to 14 September he was Minister of War, in which capacity he displayed great ability. His popularity and contacts with radical Jacobins aroused antipathy of him in the government. On the morning of 13 September he found his resignation announced in the Moniteur before he was aware that he had tendered it. This was a trick; played upon him by Sieyès and Roger Ducos, the directors allied to Napoleon.

Though Bernadotte declined to help Napoleon Bonaparte stage his coup d'état of November 1799, Napoleon was resolved to win over the "Obstacle Man" and showered him with honors. Napoleon acknowledged Bernadotte's administrative ability and influence by naming him a Councillor of State in February 1800. In April 1800, despite his Republican sympathies, Bernadotte was offered, and freely accepted, from April 1800 to 18 August 1801, the post of Commander-in-Chief of the Army of the West in the rebellious Vendée where he successfully restored its tranquility. This was seen as an appointment of trust as while Napoleon embarked on his summer Italian Campaign, where he ultimately prevailed at the Battle of Marengo, he left Bernadotte not far from Paris with an army. In his farewell note to Bernadotte on his way to Italy, Napoleon wrote: "I am going to fling myself once more into the hazards of war. We do not know how it may turn out. If I fall, you will find yourself with 40,000 men at the gates of Paris. In your hands will be the fate of the Republic." As Bernadotte was brother-in-law to Joseph and close friends with his other brothers and sisters, Napoleon is thought to have been considering the welfare of his family in the possible event of his death on the battlefield, as well as the future of the country, by leaving his erstwhile rival in a position to seize the reins of government as, of his former rivals, only Bernadotte had the political and military skill and popularity to maintain the Republic.

In 1802, Napoleon Bonaparte proposed that Bernadotte head to New France to serve as governor of Louisiana, which was to be transferred back to French control following the Third Treaty of San Ildefonso. In accepting the position, Bernadotte requested additional soldiers, settlers, and funding to support the colony, but Napoleon refused. In response, Bernadotte, declined the posting and instead was named plenipotentiary ambassador to the United States. His posting was cancelled after the Sale of Louisiana.

Marshal of the French Empire
On the introduction of the First French Empire, Bernadotte became one of the eighteen Marshals of the Empire, and from June 1804 to September 1805 served as governor of the recently occupied Hanover. In this capacity, as well as during his later command of the army of northern Germany, he created for himself a reputation for independence, incorruptibility, moderation, and administrative ability. Bernadotte's rule was popular, and despite the exactions taken from the populace as part of Napoleon's policy of making occupations pay for themselves, Hanover's economy prospered. Bernadotte extended his protection, and made private contributions to, Gottingen University, befriending many of the professors and other men of learning whom he often had over for dinner and employed to tutor himself and his wife. 

During the campaign of 1805, Bernadotte, with his army corps from Hanover formed into the I Corps, commanded the Left Wing of the Grand Army overseeing Auguste de Marmont's II Corps and having the majority of the Bavarian Army attached to his command; some 65,000 men or 1/4th of the Army. Bernadotte was also tasked with assuring France's newest ally, the Elector of Bavaria, Maximillian Joseph, that the Austrians would be driven from his country.

Bernadotte, with Davout's III Corps attached to his command, and the Bavarians, gained a victory over the Austrians driving them out of Munich on 12 October, taking some 3000 prisoners and 19 guns and installing Maximillian Joseph back onto his throne. I Corps then co-operated in the great movement which resulted in the shutting off of Mack in the Battle of Ulm. Bernadotte's troops then captured Salzburg on 30 October. In the Battle of Austerlitz (2 December 1805) he was posted with his corps in the center between Soult and Lannes, and contributed to defeating the attempt of the right wing of the allies to outflank the French army. As a reward for his services at Austerlitz, he became the 1st Sovereign Prince of Ponte Corvo (5 June 1806), a district of Naples formerly subject to the Pope.

During the 1805 campaign against Prussia, Bernadotte was reproached by Napoleon for not participating with his army corps in the battles of Jena and Auerstädt (14 October 1806). Napoleon, on the night of 13 October, thinking he had faced the whole Prussian army at Jena, sent orders to Davout, through Marshal Berthier, Davout relayed the order to Bernadotte at 0400 on 14 October with the order stating: "If the Prince of Ponte Corvo [Bernadotte] is with you, you may both march together, but the Emperor hopes that he will be in the position which had been indicated at Dornburg." This was in accordance with Bernadotte's last set of written orders from 12 October which ordered him and Davout to get across the Prussian line of retreat. In pursuance of these orders, Bernadotte, separately from Davout, left Naumburg at dawn on the morning of the 14th for Dornburg and marched toward Apolda, which he reached by 16:00. Hampered by the very poor state of the roads, and a steep defile within which Dornburg is situated and the narrow bridge which passes over the Saale, that could pass but one artillery piece at a time according to General Dupont, he could not engage in the Battle of Jena, though he effectively compelled the Prussians to retreat from both battlefields by posting his troops on the heights of Apolda.

The defile was such an obstacle that Bernadotte's 3rd Infantry division, commanded by Jean-Baptiste Drouet, Comte d'Erlon, was still in the midst of crossing the bridge well after nightfall, making it unlikely that Bernadotte could have intervened at Auerstädt in any event. He later was accused of deliberately refusing to support Davout, who had unexpectedly encountered the Prussian main army at Auerstädt, out of jealousy, and Napoleon, if reminiscences from St. Helena may be believed, once intended to put Bernadotte before a court-martial. In fact, he did what he had been ordered to do, and more fundamental responsibility for his absence rests upon the ambiguous and indirect orders issued by Berthier and Napoleon's unawareness of the Prussian position. Documentary evidence supports Bernadotte's assertion that he was ordered to Dornberg as no orders from Napoleon to Bernadotte to march with Davout were ever found in French Imperial Archives while Berthier's order of 14 October were confirmed.

After the Battle of Jena, Bernadotte crushed the Prussian Reserve Army, all fresh troops fortified behind a marsh and the River Saale, under Duke Eugen of Württemberg at Halle (17 October 1806), though Imperial Headquarters did not much appreciate this victory. When visiting Halle after the battle, and commenting on the degree of difficulty of storming a fortified position accessible only by a single bridge, Napoleon enigmatically commented "Bernadotte stops at nothing. Someday the Gascon will get caught." Subsequently, Bernadotte pursued, conjointly with Soult and Murat (known as the "Pursuit of the Three Marshals"), Prussian general Blücher's Corps to Lübeck, where his troops stormed the Prussian defenses, taking the city and forcing Blücher's capitulation at Radkow (7 November 1806). When the French forced their way into Lübeck, the city became the target of large-scale looting and rampage by the French soldiers. Bernadotte, struggling desperately to prevent his men from sacking the city, was given six horses from the Council of Lübeck as a token of their appreciation. He also treated with courtesy 1600 Swedish prisoners, under the command of Colonel Count Gustave Mörner, and allowed them to return to their home country. The impressed Swedes went home with a tale of Bernadotte's fairness in maintaining order within the city. Count Mörner would later play a prominent role in the election of Bernadotte as Crown Prince of Sweden.

Thereafter he marched to Poland in command of the French Left Wing, composed of his I Corps and Ney's VI Corps. Left unsupported by Ney's unexpected movement toward Königsberg, the Russians under Levin August von Bennigsen, passed over to the offensive and attempted to destroy Bernadotte's and Ney's isolated Corps. Napoleon, having received word of the Russian offensive, gave word to Bernadotte to retreat West as to draw the Russians toward him so that Napoleon could then cut-off and surround the Russians. Bernadotte moved West as ordered, pursued by Bennigsen where he defeated the numerically superior Russian vanguard at Mohrungen (25 January 1807).

During the battle Bernadotte's personal wagon was captured by the Russians and he was accused, by the Cossacks who looted his baggage, of having extorted a large quantity of silver plate from minor German states. This claim is unsubstantiated and contrary to his reputation. He was known throughout the army for his probity and honesty in the conduct of his affairs on campaign and he refrained from the looting and brigandage that many of his fellow marshals engaged in. As a consequence, his table fare was considered poor by his brother marshals and while others dined on fine service and employed chefs, he habitually used his own money to pay for food for his troops, and to give money awards to those who merited recognition. He held his troops to the same high standard and punished looting and raping severely and was known to intervene with his sword drawn against those engaged in pillaging, as was the case following the capture of Lübeck.

 Due to the capture of a courier carrying the Emperor's latest orders, Bernadotte was not informed of a change of strategy to move East toward the rest of the French Army. As a consequence, Bernadotte's I Corps was too far away to take part in the Battle of Eylau (7 to 8 February 1807). Napoleon rebuked him for his absence but it became acknowledged that it was not due to Bernadotte, but Berthier's carelessness in dispatching the orderly. The Russians resumed the offensive that summer and Bernadotte was attacked by, and defeated, a strong Prussian Corps at Spanden, preserving the French bridgehead over the Pasłęka, where he was nearly killed when a spent ball struck him in the neck. Due to this near fatal wound, Bernadotte was invalided to the rear and missed the remainder of the Polish Campaign.

After the Peace of Tilsit, on 14 July 1807, he became governor of the Hanseatic towns, where he once again proved his administrative and diplomatic abilities and was well-liked. He was to direct the expedition against Sweden, via the Danish islands, but the plan came to naught because of the want of transports and the defection of the Spanish contingent, which went back to Spain to fight against Napoleon at the start of the Peninsular War. Pursuant to the projected invasion of Sweden, and by virtue of Denmark becoming an ally of France in 1808, Bernadotte found himself de facto head of a French occupation of Denmark. He maintained strict discipline of his troops and his good treatment of the Danes made him popular with the populace and Danish Royal Family. Upon his departure from Denmark he was one of few Frenchmen of the period to be awarded the Order of the Elephant.

During Bernadotte's time as governor of the Hanseatic cities, the Abdications of Bayonne occurred, an event that triggered the Peninsular War that would play so large a role in Napoleon's defeat. For a time Napoleon considered the notion of placing Bernadotte on the Spanish throne; going so far as to hint at it in a letter to him. Bernadotte made it known to Napoleon that he did not want the Spanish Crown. Joseph Bonaparte, Bernadotte's friend and brother-in-law, was chosen instead. It was not the first, or last time, that Napoleon thought of placing Bernadotte on a foreign throne. Indeed, Napoleon on several occasions, both during his days as First Consul and then as Emperor, thought of naming Bernadotte (Napoleon also considered Murat) as his successor by adoption. Despite their rivalry, Napoleon thought Bernadotte alone had the popularity, administrative and military skill to safeguard the Empire he had built. The birth of the King of Rome put an end to Napoleon's need for an heir. Ironically, Bernadotte eventually wore a crown, not through the auspices of Napoleon, but as an enemy of France.

Recalled to Germany to assist in the new war between France and Austria, he received the command of the 9th Corps, which was mainly composed of Saxons.  Further difficulties with Berthier, and a saddling with ill-prepared Saxons, combined with an illness, compelled Bernadotte to beg for release from service. Bernadotte wrote to Napoleon that "I see my efforts perpetually paralyzed by a hidden force over which I can not prevail." Napoleon disregarded these appeals and Bernadotte proceeded with the campaign, commanding mostly foreign troops with few French troops under his command.
At the Battle of Wagram (5 July 1809), he entered battle with his Saxon corps, to which the division of Dupas was attached and which formed his reserve. Resting on the French Left, Bernadotte's corps was battered during the night but resisted the full fury of the Austrian attack facing superior numbers. At a critical moment he ordered Dupas forward to his support; the latter replied that he had orders from the emperor to remain where he was. Having been badly mauled, and fully exposed ahead of the main French line, IX Corps withdrew from the village of Aderklaa against Napoleon's orders. On the second day of battle, 6 July 1809, IX Corps, having been mauled the night before, wherein Bernadotte struggled to rally his demoralized Saxons, was attacked by two Austrian corps, as part of Archduke Charles's effort to break the French line. This time Bernadotte's depleted forces—he had only 6,000 infantry left—broke and fled (Bernadotte's Corps was not the only one to break that day, Masséna's troops were also routed by the attack). The routed Saxons retreated in disorder toward Raasdorf as Bernadotte attempted to rally his men, where he encountered Napoleon. IX Corps rallied and played a further role in the battle. Rumors that Napoleon relieved Bernadotte of command on the spot at Raasdorf have long been the stuff of legend, but are not verified. After the battle, Bernadotte complained to Napoleon for having, in violation of all military rules, ordered Dupas to act independently of his command, and for having thereby caused great loss of life to the Saxons, and tendered his resignation. Napoleon accepted after he had become aware of an order of the day issued by Bernadotte in which he gave the Saxons credit for their courage in terms inconsistent with the emperor's official bulletin. Accounts of Bernadotte's role at Wagram are contradictory. While it is true that IX Corps broke on 6 July, as did other French formations, they later rallied and played a part in the victory. Moreover, Bernadotte fought with exceptional personal courage, at the head of his troops, and narrowly avoided death when attacked by Austrian cavalry. It is likely that IX Corps' poor performance would have been forgotten, and Bernadotte would have retained his command, had he never published the controversial Order of the Day. His praise for the Saxons, as well as his mild and courteous treatment of them while under his command, was never forgotten by the Saxon officers and this would later have disastrous consequences for the French when a whole Saxon division defected to Bernadotte's Army of the North during a key moment of the Battle of Leipzig.

With Bernadotte having returned to Paris, the Walcheren Campaign (July 1809) caused the French ministry in the absence of the emperor to entrust him with the defense of Antwerp with both regular French and Dutch troops along with the National Guard. Bernadotte took command of a chaotic situation wherein troops from all over the Empire and its vassal states, and raw conscripts, were sent to Holland under divided command. He re-organized and trained his forces, named by the Emperor as the Army of Antwerp, by instilling discipline in old soldiers too long at the depots and teaching raw conscripts their trade. Everywhere he instilled a fighting spirit, making an army out of a mob, and thus he rapidly brought the defenses of Antwerp to a high order of readiness. With Antwerp bristling with cannon and numerous defenders, and with the Army of Antwerp whipped into fighting shape, the British, vexed by poor leadership and with half the army immobilized with fever thanks to the insalubrious islands upon which they were quartered, realized that it was no longer possible to close the Scheldt, or take Antwerp, and they withdrew their forces. In a proclamation issued to his troops at Antwerp he made an implied charge against Napoleon of having neglected to prepare the proper means of defense for the Belgian coast. A displeased Napoleon relieved Bernadotte of command of his ad hoc army, and ordered his return to Paris to leave for Catalonia and take command of the Army there. Refusing to comply with the order, he was summoned to Vienna, and after an interview with Napoleon at Schönbrunn accepted the general government of the Roman states.

Offer of the Swedish throne

In 1810 Bernadotte was about to enter his new post as governor of Rome when he was unexpectedly elected the heir-presumptive to King Charles XIII of Sweden. The problem of Charles's successor had been acute almost from the time he had ascended the throne a year earlier. He was 61 years old and in poor health. He was also childless; Queen Charlotte had given birth to two children who had died in infancy, and there was no prospect of her bearing another child. Soon after his coronation, the king had adopted a Danish prince, Charles August, who had died just a few months after his arrival. Despite the fact that Napoleon favored his ally Danish King Frederick VI, Danish Prince Frederick Christian initially had the most support to become Swedish Crown Prince as well.

The political situation internally and externally for Sweden meant that selecting a foreign king was an attractive option. Sweden wanted to strengthen its relationship with Napoleon for militaristic reasons so sought to select a king who would be able to attract Napoleon's support. The Swedish court initially sounded out the emperor for his preferences on candidates for crown prince, whereupon Napoleon made it clear he preferred his adopted stepson Eugène de Beauharnais, or one of his nephews or brothers. The Swedish envoys did not accept Eugène as a candidate. Baron Lagerbielke, the Swedish envoy in Paris, reported to Stockholm that Eugène was "gentle and good," "but he does not seem to be a man of strong character; and, although he had had great opportunities, he does not appear to have developed any distinguishing talents." Also, Eugène, serving as viceroy in Italy, did not wish to convert to Lutheranism, a prerequisite for accepting the Swedish offer. Moreover, none of Napoleon's brothers were interested in going to Sweden and his nephews were too young, as the Swedes did not want the hazards of minority rule in the event King Charles died prematurely. The matter was decided by an obscure Swedish courtier, Baron Karl Otto Mörner (nephew of Count Gustav Mörner, the commander of the Swedish force captured by Bernadotte at Lübeck), who, entirely on his own initiative, offered the succession to the Swedish crown to Bernadotte. Bernadotte communicated Mörner's offer to Napoleon who at first treated the situation as an absurdity, but later came around to the idea and supported Bernadotte's candidacy both financially and diplomatically.

Although the Swedish government, amazed at Mörner's effrontery, at once placed him under arrest on his return to Sweden, the candidature of Bernadotte gradually gained favour and on 21 August 1810 he was elected by the Riksdag of the Estates in Örebro to be the new crown prince, and was subsequently made Generalissimus of the Swedish Armed Forces by the King. Several factors benefitted Bernadotte's election. Being foreign was, although problematic, also to his favour due to geopolitical factors and the internal situation at the time. One benefit was his (presumed) close ties to French Emperor Napoleon Bonaparte, with whom a relationship would provide military backing as the intention at the time was to reacquire Finland. The current King, Charles XIII, viewed Napoleon in a more positive way than Gustav IV Adolf had, who had held him in very ill regard. Another point in favour was that a large part of the Swedish Army, anticipating conflict with Russia, were in favour of electing a soldier. Also, Bernadotte was personally popular, owing to the kindness he had shown to the Swedish prisoners in Lübeck and his reputation as the well-liked governor of the Hanseatic Cities from 1807 to 1809; as many Swedish merchants had operated under his auspices. Finally, Bernadotte had no qualms about converting to Lutheranism, recalling the conversion of Henry IV for the benefit of France with whom he felt a kinship with as both hailed from Pau, nor converting his son Oscar (though his wife Désirée never did renounce Catholicism).

Before freeing Bernadotte from his allegiance to France, Napoleon asked him to agree never to take up arms against France. Bernadotte refused to make any such agreement, upon the ground that his obligations to Sweden would not allow it; Napoleon exclaimed "Go, and let our destinies be accomplished" and signed the act of emancipation unconditionally. Many were also optimistic that Sweden would capture Finland under Charles John. The Swedish crown prince even unsuccessfully sought Napoleon's support to assist Sweden in conquering Norway.

Crown Prince and Regent

On 2 November 1810 Bernadotte made his solemn entry into Stockholm, and on 5 November he received the homage of the Riksdag of the Estates, and he was adopted by King Charles XIII under the name of "Charles John" (Karl Johan). At the same time, he converted from Roman Catholicism to the Lutheranism of the Swedish court; Swedish law required the monarch to be Lutheran.

The new Crown Prince was very soon the most popular and most powerful man in Sweden and quickly impressed his adoptive father. Following his first meeting with his new heir, Charles XIII (who had initially opposed Bernadotte's candidacy) remarked to his aide-de-camp count Charles de Suremain "My dear Suremain, I have gambled heavily, and I believe that after all I have won."  He also made himself well liked by Queen Charlotte, who regarded him a "gentleman in every sense of the word", and established a net of contact within the Swedish aristocracy, befriending in particular the Brahe family through his favorite Magnus Brahe and countess Aurora Wilhelmina Brahe, whose cousin Mariana Koskull became his lover.

The infirmity of the old King and the dissensions in the Privy Council of Sweden placed the government, and especially the control of foreign policy, entirely in his hands. Amongst the first of Charles John's acts as Crown Prince was to address the dire state of the Swedish economy. The Swedish economy was in shambles after years of mismanagement since the reign of Gustav III and aggravated during the reign of his son Gustav IV Adolf. The economic turmoil had been caused, in part, by the debts accrued from Gustav III's Russian War, in part to the failure of several of Gustav IV Adolf's well intentioned economic reforms (Gustav IV Adolf was rather more successful in his agrarian reforms) and the costs of the more recent wars against France and Russia. Under Gustav IV Adolf genuine attempts at economic reform, including paying down the national debt by some 700,000 Riksdalers in the first years of his active reign, and revitalizing the currency, met with limited success.

Such measures were undermined by his other policies. Gustav IV Adolf's personal dislike of the Riksdag, which had the power to raise taxes, led to his refusal to call them into session after 1800, crippling his attempts to raise state revenues. Gustav IV Adolf's foreign policy plunged Sweden into disastrous (and expensive) wars against France and Russia. The cost of years of war, several poor harvests in the years between 1798 and 1809, the ineptitude of his ministers in carrying out fiscal reforms, and the loss of the tax base of Finland had ballooned Sweden's national debt. The impending demands of Napoleon to adhere to the Continental System forecasted even greater difficulties. Charles John immediately began making reforms, and used his sizable fortune, accrued honestly during his time as French Marshal, to pay off much of the debt, and to stabilize the economy by both grants and via a loan to the state of £300,000 sterling at five percent interest. Charles John also purchased back from the French private estates that had been confiscated during the occupation of Swedish Pomerania from 1808 to 1810 and returned them to their original Swedish and German owners.

The keynote of his foreign and domestic policy was maintenance of Swedish independence of action, often in the face of French demands, and the acquisition of Norway as a compensation for the loss of Finland. Many Swedes expected him to reconquer Finland, which had been ceded to Russia. The Crown Prince was aware of its difficulty for reasons of the desperate situation of the state finance and the reluctance of the Finnish people to return to Sweden. Even if Finland was regained, he thought, it would put Sweden into a new cycle of conflicts with a powerful neighbor because there was no guarantee Russia would accept the loss as final. Therefore, he made up his mind to make a united Scandinavian peninsula, which was easier to defend, by taking Norway (intentionally without the ancient and remote provinces of Greenland, Iceland and the Faroe Islands) from Denmark and uniting her to Sweden. He tried to divert public opinion from Finland to Norway, by arguing that to create a compact peninsula, with sea for its natural boundary, was to inaugurate an era of peace, and that waging war with Russia would lead to ruinous consequences.

Soon after Charles John's arrival in Sweden, Napoleon compelled him to accede to the Continental System and declare war against Great Britain; otherwise, Sweden would have to face the determination of France, Denmark and Russia. This demand would mean a hard blow to the national economy and the Swedish population. Sweden reluctantly declared war against the UK, which was treated by both countries as merely nominal, although Swedish imports of British goods decreased from £4,871 million in 1810 to £523 million in the following year.

In January 1812, French troops suddenly invaded Swedish Pomerania and the island of Rügen. Officially, the French claimed that Sweden had repeatedly violated the Continental System and that the occupation of Stralsund and Swedish Pomerania was closing an entrepôt for illegal British goods. Napoleon, before marching to Moscow, also had to secure his rear and dared not allow a Swedish continental foothold behind him as he did not trust Charles John. Charles John believed that Napoleon scheduled the occupation to occur on the Crown Prince's birthday, and ordered Charles John's old rival Marshal Davout to execute the operation, as a personal insult, adding another dimension of personal enmity to the incident. As a result, the initially amicable relationship which Charles John had with Napoleon, following his election as Crown Prince, soon changed because of the invasion. The invasion was a clear violation of international law as well as an act of war and public opinion in Sweden was outraged. Moreover, it antagonized the pro-French faction at the Swedish court. Thereafter, the Crown Prince declared the neutrality of Sweden and opened negotiations with the UK and Russia.

In 1812, he allied Sweden with its traditional enemy Russia, and sought to make peace with the United Kingdom with whom Sweden was technically at war. Charles John's personal diplomacy served as the bridge between Russia and the UK as on 18 July 1812 the Treaty of Örebro formally ended the wars between Britain and Sweden and Britain and Russia and formed an alliance between Russia, Britain, and Sweden; creating the Sixth Coalition. The treaty stipulated that Sweden would land an army of no less than 25,000 on the continent for the express purpose of fighting France, as well as liberating Swedish Pomerania, and in exchange, Russia and the UK would diplomatically and militarily support the cession of Norway from the doggedly French-allied Denmark to Sweden. Throughout summer and fall 1812, Bernadotte sought to add more allies to the Coalition, and negotiated a treaty with the Spanish Bourbons against his own brother-in-law who was currently King of Spain. Although Napoleon had forced Frederick Wilhelm III to break off relations with Sweden, Charles John corresponded with the King of Prussia, encouraging him to renounce the forced alliance with France and join the Coalition. Following the Convention of Tauroggen, which broke the Prussian/French Alliance, Frederick Wilhelm signed the Treaty of Kalisz with Russia, and then a separate peace treaty with Sweden, on the basis of Prussian recognition of the Norwegian cession to Sweden, in exchange for Swedish Pomerania, thus formally joining the Coalition in spring 1813.

After the defeats at Lützen (2 May 1813) and Bautzen (21 May 1813), it was the Swedish Crown Prince who put fresh fighting spirit into the Allies; and at the conference of Trachenberg he drew up the Trachenberg Plan, the general plan for the campaign which began after the expiration of the Truce of Pläswitz.

Charles John, as the Commander-in-Chief of the Northern Army, successfully defended the approaches to Berlin and was victorious in battle against Oudinot in August and against Ney in September at the Battles of Großbeeren and Dennewitz. Bernadotte's Army of the North would continue to guard Berlin and keep watch on Davout's forces in Hamburg while the Allies, in accordance with the plan conceived at Trachenberg, maneuvered toward Napoleon's army at Leipzig. With the other Allied armies engaged in battle on 17 October, Bernadotte's army finally crossed the Elbe and joined in the Battle of Leipzig on 19 October. His fresh troops, reinforced by 30,000 Prussians, joined the fray against the already battered French lines where Swedish forces entered battle in numbers for the first time in the campaign. At a critical moment entire Saxon regiments went over to his army in response to a proclamation released a week prior in which Bernadotte invited the Saxons to join their old commander in defeating Napoleon. The Army of the North committed the coup de grâce on the already depleted French and Bernadotte was the first of the Allied sovereigns to enter Leipzig.

After the Battle of Leipzig he went his own way, determined at all hazards to cripple Denmark and to secure Norway, defeating the Danes in a relatively quick campaign.  His efforts culminated in the favourable Treaty of Kiel, which transferred Norway to Swedish control.

The Norwegians rejected Swedish control. They declared independence, adopted a liberal constitution and elected Danish crown prince Christian Frederick to the throne. The ensuing war was swiftly won by Sweden under Charles John's generalship. The military operations in 1814 were to be Sweden's last war to this day. Charles John could have named his terms to Norway, but in a key concession accepted the Norwegian constitution and its own political autonomy. This paved the way for Norway to enter a personal union with Sweden later that year.

During the period of the Allied invasion of France in the winter and spring of 1814, when it was unclear who would rule France after the war, the Russian Tsar Alexander I, with support from French liberals like Benjamin Constant and Madame de Staël, advocated placing Charles John on the French throne in place of Napoleon. He would rule France as a Constitutional Monarch and leave Oscar as Regent in Sweden and Norway. Ultimately the British and Austrians vetoed the idea, and the Allies agreed that if Napoleon were to be deposed, the only acceptable alternative was the restoration of the House of Bourbon.

King of Sweden and Norway

Charles John had been regent and de facto head of state upon his arrival, and took an increasing role in government from 1812 onward, with Charles XIII reduced to a mute witness in government councils following a stroke.

Upon Charles's death on 5 February 1818, Charles John ascended the throne. He was initially popular in both countries. The democratic process and forces steadily matured under the King's restrained executive power.

The foreign policy applied by Charles John in the post-Napoleonic era was characterized by the maintenance of balance between the Great Powers and non-involvement into conflicts that took place outside of the Scandinavian peninsula. It made a sharp contrast with Sweden's previous hegemonic expansionism resulting in uninterrupted wars with neighboring countries for centuries, and he successfully kept his kingdoms in a state of peace from 1814 until his death. He was especially concerned about the conflict between the UK and Russia. In 1834, when the relationship between the two countries strained regarding the Near East Crisis, he sent memoranda to British and Russian governments and proclaimed neutrality in advance. It is pointed out as the origin of Swedish neutrality.

His domestic policy particularly focused on promotion of economy and investment in social overhead capital, and the long peace since 1814 led to an increased prosperity for the country. During his long reign of 26 years (34 years if one counts his time as regent from 1810 to 1818), the population of the Kingdom was so increased that the inhabitants of Sweden alone became equal in number to those of Sweden and Finland before the latter province was torn from the former, the national debt was paid off, a civil and a penal code were proposed for promulgation, education was promoted, agriculture, commerce, and manufactures prospered, and the means of internal communication were increased.

On the other hand, radical in his youth, his views had veered steadily rightward over the years, and by the time he ascended the throne he was an ultra-conservative.  His autocratic methods, particularly his censorship of the press, were very unpopular, especially after 1823.  His dynasty faced little danger, as the Swedes and the Norwegians alike were proud of a monarch with a good European reputation.

He also faced challenges in Norway. The Norwegian constitution gave the Norwegian parliament, the Storting, more power than any legislature in Europe.  While Charles John had the power of absolute veto in Sweden, he only had a suspensive veto in Norway.  He demanded that the Storting give him the power of absolute veto, but was forced to back down. Charles John's difficult relationship with Norway was also demonstrated by the Storting's unwillingness to grant funds for the construction of a Royal Palace in the Norwegian capital Oslo. The construction began in 1825, but the Storting halted the funding after the costly foundation was laid and demanded that the appointed architect, Hans Linstow, construct a simpler palace. This was seen by many as a protest against unnecessary spending and the king's authority. The palace itself was not completed until 1849, long after the death of Charles John, and was inaugurated by Oscar I. The main street in Oslo, Slottsgaten, would later be named after Charles John as Karl Johans gate.

His popularity decreased for a time in the 1830s, culminating in the Rabulist riots after the Lèse-majesté conviction of the journalist Magnus Jacob Crusenstolpe, and some calls for his abdication. Charles John survived the abdication controversy and he went on to have his silver jubilee, which was celebrated with great enthusiasm on 18 February 1843. He reigned as King of Sweden and Norway from 5 February 1818 until his death in 1844.

Death

On 26 January 1844, his 81st birthday, Charles John was found unconscious in his chambers having suffered a stroke. While he regained consciousness, he never fully recovered and died on the afternoon of 8 March. On his deathbed, he was heard to say:

His remains were interred after a state funeral in Stockholm's Riddarholm Church. He was succeeded by his only son, Oscar I.

Honours
 The main street of Oslo, Karl Johans gate, was named after him in 1852.
 The main base for the Royal Norwegian Navy, Karljohansvern, was also named after him in 1854.
 The Karlsborg Fortress, located in present-day Karlsborg Municipality in Västra Götaland County, was also named in honour of him.
 The , a French military building located in Pau, was also named after him in 1875.
 The bronze equestrian statue of the King at the Royal Palace, Oslo, unveiled in 1875, is the largest bronze statue in Norway.

National
 French Empire: Knight Grand Eagle of the Legion of Honour, 2 February 1805
 Kingdom of Italy: Knight Grand Cross of the Order of the Iron Crown
 Sweden:
 Knight of the Order of the Seraphim, 21 August 1810
 Knight Grand Cross of the Order of the Sword, 1st Class, 21 August 1810
 Commander Grand Cross of the Order of Vasa, 28 January 1813
 Commander Grand Cross of the Order of the Polar Star, 21 August 1810
 Knight of the Order of Charles XIII, 21 August 1810

He became Lord and Master of all Swedish orders of chivalry upon his accession to the throne.

Foreign

Arms and monogram

Fictional portrayals

The tattoo is finally revealed to read  ("Long live the Republic") and a Phrygian cap: a highly ironic image and text for the skin of a king. This play was so popular that the idea that King Charles XIV John had a tattoo reading "Death to kings" is often repeated as fact, although there is no basis to it. For reasons of discretion, he publicly proclaimed himself in 1797 "a Republican both by principle and conviction" who would “to the moment of my death, oppose all Royalists and enemies to the Directory".

Désirée Clary's relationships with Bonaparte and Bernadotte were the subject of the novel Désirée by Annemarie Selinko.

The novel was filmed as Désirée in 1954, with Marlon Brando as Napoleon, Jean Simmons as Désirée, and Michael Rennie as Bernadotte.

Bernadotte is a primary supporting character in the historical fiction novel by New York Times Bestselling author Allison Pataki A Queen's Fortune: A Novel of Désirée, Napoleon, and the Dynasty that outlasted the Empire, that tells the life story of his wife (and Queen of Sweden and Norway) Désirée Clary.

See also
 Swedish–Norwegian War (1814)
 Union between Sweden and Norway
 Napoleonic Wars
 War of the Sixth Coalition
 War of the Seventh Coalition

Notes

References
 
 
 Alm, Mikael; Johansson, Brittinger (Eds) (2008). Script of Kingship: Essays on Bernadotte and Dynastic Formation in an Age of Revolution, Reklam & katalogtryck AB, Uppsala. 
 
 
 
 
 
 
 
 
 
 
 
 
 
 
 
 
 
 
 
 
 
 
 
Attribution

Further reading 
 Alm, Mikael and Britt-Inger Johansson, eds. Scripts of Kingship: Essays on Bernadotte and Dynastic Formation in an Age of Revolution (Uppsala: Swedish Science Press, 2008)
 Review by Rasmus Glenthøj, English Historical Review (2010) 125#512 pp. 205–08.
 Barton, Dunbar B.: The amazing career of Bernadotte, 1930; condensed one-volume biography based on Barton's detailed 3 vol biography 1914–1925, which contained many documents
 Koht, Halvdan. "Bernadotte and Swedish-American Relations, 1810–1814," Journal of Modern History (1944) 16#4 pp. 265–85 in JSTOR
 Kurtz, Harold. "Sergeant, Marshal and King: Jean Baptiste Bernadotte, 1763–1844" History Today (Jan 1964) 14#1 pp 3–13 and part 2, . (Mar 1964) 14#3 pp171–180
 Lord Russell of Liverpool: Bernadotte: Marshal of France & King of Sweden, 1981
 Jean-Marc Olivier. "Bernadotte Revisited, or the Complexity of a Long Reign (1810–1844)", in Nordic Historical Review, n°2, 2006.
 Scott, Franklin D.  Bernadotte and the Fall of Napoleon (1935); scholarly analysis
 Moncure, James A. ed. Research Guide to European Historical Biography: 1450–Present (4 vol. 1992); vol. 1, pp. 126–34

External links
 
 
 

1763 births
1844 deaths
19th-century Swedish monarchs
19th-century Norwegian monarchs
Adult adoptees
People from Pau, Pyrénées-Atlantiques
French emigrants to Sweden
Naturalized citizens of Sweden
Swedish people of French descent
House of Bernadotte
Regents of Sweden
Regents of Norway
Charles 3 John
Swedish Lutherans
Military leaders of the French Revolutionary Wars
French military personnel of the French Revolutionary Wars
Marshals of the First French Empire
Members of the Royal Swedish Academy of Sciences
Occitan people
Burials at Riddarholmen Church
Swedish military commanders of the Napoleonic Wars
Swedish adoptees
Converts to Lutheranism from Roman Catholicism
18th-century French politicians
French Ministers of War
French Freemasons
Grand Croix of the Légion d'honneur
Knights Grand Cross of the Order of the Sword
Commanders Grand Cross of the Order of the Polar Star
Grand Crosses of the Order of Vasa
Grand Masters of the Order of Charles XIII
Knights of the Order of Charles XIII
Knights of the Golden Fleece of Spain
Recipients of the Iron Cross (1813)
Grand Crosses of the Military Order of Maria Theresa
Recipients of the Grand Cross of the Iron Cross
Recipients of the Order of St. George of the First Degree
Names inscribed under the Arc de Triomphe
Charles XIV John